"Dark Lady" is a folk song recorded by American singer-actress Cher, and the title selection from her eleventh studio album, Dark Lady. Written and composed by John Robert "Johnny" Durrill and produced by Snuff Garrett, it was released as the album's first single in early 1974. The song became Cher's third solo U.S. #1 hit on March 22, 1974.

Song information and story 
The song was written and composed by The Ventures' keyboard player, Johnny Durrill. He recalled: "I spent a week in his (Snuff Garrett's) office playing him songs, one of which Cher recorded. Later, when I was on tour in Japan with the Ventures, I was writing an interesting song. I telegraphed the unfinished lyrics to Garrett. He said to 'make sure the bitch kills him.' Hence, in the song both the lover and fortune teller were killed." Thus, "Dark Lady" may with some accuracy be described as a murder ballad, even though the narrator of its lyrics essentially commits a crime of passion.

The critic Peter Fawthrop, writing for AllMusic, called this song a "grimly comedic folk song."

The "Dark Lady" of the song's title is a gypsy fortune teller in New Orleans with an implied history of sleeping with clients (the narrator of the song describes seeing scratches on the inside of the fortune teller's limousine from her previous conquests). The narrator follows the fortune teller's limousine to her lair and pays money for a fortune; as a result of the fortune, she learns that her lover has been unfaithful to her with, as the (audibly uncomfortable) fortune teller says, "someone else who is very close to you." Advised to leave the fortune teller's shop, never to return, and to forget she has ever seen the fortune teller's face, the narrator returns home in a state of shock, unable to sleep. But then she realizes to her horror that she had once smelled, in her own room, the very perfume that the fortune teller had been wearing. Sneaking back to the fortune teller's shop with a gun, she there catches her lover and the fortune teller "laughing and kissing," and shoots them both to death, presumably in a fit of rage; the song implies she blacked out upon shooting. ("Next thing I knew, they were dead on the floor.")

In 1974, "Dark Lady" topped the U.S. Billboard Hot 100 for one week, becoming Cher's third solo #1 hit. The song became a top 10 hit in Norway and a top 20 hit in the Netherlands. Like "Half-Breed," the song struggled in West Germany and the UK, though it managed to reach top 40 status in the UK.

Music video 

There are two versions of the video. 
The first version of the video is a live performance that was aired in the third season of The Sonny & Cher Comedy Hour in 1973. In this performance Cher was dressed all in black and was wearing a black veil on her head. The second version of the video is an animated cartoon done by John David Wilson's animation studio; this second video follows the whole story of the song.

In 2002, a special remix medley was created by Dan-O-Rama for a video montage that was used in Cher's Living Proof: The Farewell Tour. The medley contains videos of "All I Really Want to Do", "Gypsies, Tramps and Thieves", "Half-Breed", and "Dark Lady". Unlike the other videos, "Dark Lady" was unique because both the live-action and the animated videos had been mixed.

In 1999, Cher performed this song throughout her Do You Believe? Tour, for the first time in twenty-five years. In 2002, she performed the song 325 times in her Living Proof: The Farewell Tour.

Cher performed the song on the following concert tours/Las Vegas residencies:
Do You Believe? Tour
The Farewell Tour
Cher at the Colosseum
Dressed to Kill Tour
Classic Cher
Here We Go Again Tour (Oceanian leg only)

Charts and certifications

Weekly charts

Year-end charts

Certifications

Formats and track listing

UK and US 7"
"Dark Lady" – 3:26
"Two People Clinging to a Thread" – 2:40

Argentina 7"
"Dark Lady" – 3:26
"Carousel Man" – 3:02
 

Not Released
"Dark Lady" (Mixmaster F Farewell Club Mix) (a.k.a. White Label Remix) – 7:25

Credits and personnel

Cher – vocals
John "Johnny" Durrell – lyrics
Snuff Garrett – producer
Ronnie Aldrich
D. Redston
R. Williams
Longines Symphone
Magnetronics

Cover versions
In 1974 Lea Laven recorded the Finnish rendering of "Dark Lady" entitled "Tumma nainen". "Tumma nainen" was also recorded by Ami Aspelund for her 1974 album Ami and also by Jean S. for their 2003 album Sammakkoprinssi.

In the same year, Argentinian singer Johnny Tedesco recorded a Spanish version called "Te quiero tanto (Dulce gitana)".

References

External links
 Cher - Official Site
 

1974 singles
Cher songs
Billboard Hot 100 number-one singles
Number-one singles in Sweden
Songs about New Orleans
Song recordings produced by Snuff Garrett
1974 songs
MCA Records singles
Animated music videos
American folk songs